The coat of arms of Trinidad and Tobago was designed by a committee formed in 1962 to select the symbols that would be representative of the people of Trinidad and Tobago. The committee included artist Carlisle Chang (1921–2001) and carnival designer George Bailey (1935–1970).

Design
The palm tree crest at the top of the coat of arms was taken from Tobago's coat of arms before it was joined in political union with Trinidad. The shield comprises the same colours (black, red, and white) as the nation's flag and carry the same meaning. The gold ships represent the three ships Christopher Columbus used on his voyage. The two birds on the shield are hummingbirds. Trinidad is sometimes referred to as the “Land of the Hummingbird” because 18 different species of hummingbird have been recorded on the island. “Land of the Hummingbird” is also believed to have been the Amerindian name for Trinidad. The two larger birds are the Scarlet Ibis (left) and the Cocrico (right), the national birds of Trinidad and Tobago. Below the Scarlet Ibis are three hills, representing the Trinity Hills in southern Trinidad, which, it is believed, convinced Columbus to name the island after the Holy Trinity. The island rising out of the waters beneath the Cocrico represents Tobago. Below these birds is the nation's motto, "Together We Aspire, Together We Achieve." It was designed by Carlyle Chang Kezia and George Bailey.

Historical

See also
Flag of Trinidad and Tobago

References

National symbols of Trinidad and Tobago
Trinidad and Tobago
Trinidad and Tobago
Trinidad and Tobago
Trinidad and Tobago
Trinidad and Tobago
Trinidad and Tobago
Coats of arms with chevrons
Trinidad and Tobago